A list of films produced in the United Kingdom in 1956 (see 1956 in film):

1956

See also
 1956 in British music
 1956 in British television
 1956 in the United Kingdom

References

External links

1956
Films
Lists of 1956 films by country or language